The women's freestyle 59 kilograms is a competition featured at the 2008 World Wrestling Championships, and was held at the Yoyogi National Gymnasium in Tokyo, Japan on 11 October.

This freestyle wrestling competition consists of a single-elimination tournament, with a repechage used to determine the winner of two bronze medals.

Results
Legend
F — Won by fall

Final

Top half

Bottom half

Repechage

References

Women's freestyle 59 kg